

Nilwala is a river in Southern Province in Sri Lanka. It originates from Sinharaja Forest Reserve and drains to sea at Matara.

Tributaries

 Kotapola Oya
 Urubokke Oya (Diversion)
 Hulandawa Oya
 Siyambalagoda Oya

References 

Bodies of water of Matara District
Bodies of water of Ratnapura District
Rivers of Sri Lanka